Copiula major is a species of frog in the family Microhylidae.
It is found in West Papua, Indonesia and possibly Papua New Guinea.
Its natural habitat is subtropical or tropical moist lowland forests.
It is threatened by habitat loss.

References

Sources

Copiula
Amphibians of Western New Guinea
Amphibians of Indonesia
Taxonomy articles created by Polbot
Amphibians described in 2002